The Royal Norwegian Yacht Club (KNS) is a yacht club in Oslo, Norway. The club was founded in 1883 as country-wide organisation with affiliated local yacht clubs. In 1884, it was granted the right for members to fly the naval Ensign of Norway with the Royal cypher on a centrally placed white field. In 1970, it was reorganized as local club for the Oslo area, under a new nationwide federation of yacht clubs (Norges Seilforbund). To date, the club has some 4,000 members.

Clubhouse
The club premises are at Bygdøy in Frognerkilen, where the clubhouse is named "Dronningen" ('The Queen').

Regatta
The Royal Norwegian Yacht Club traditionally arranges the big Norwegian regatta called "Færderseilasen" every year, on the second weekend in June.

See also

List of International Council of Yacht Clubs members

References

External links 
 Royal Norwegian Yacht Club about the Færderseilasen (norwegian)
 

Royal yacht clubs
Yacht clubs in Norway
Sports teams in Norway
1883 establishments in Norway
Sports clubs established in 1883
Sport in Oslo